SS Thomas LeValley was a Liberty ship built in the United States during World War II. She was named after Thomas LeValley. She was transferred to the Army Transport Service (ATS) and later renamed Major General Walter R. Weaver after Major General Walter R. Weaver, a graduate of Virginia Military Institute that went on to serve in several prominent commands during World War I and World War II, in the United States Army Air Forces.

Construction
Thomas LeValley was laid down on 11 February 1944, under a Maritime Commission (MARCOM) contract, MC hull 2995, by J.A. Jones Construction, Panama City, Florida; sponsored by Mrs. L.R. Hubbard, mother-in-law of Raymond A. Jones, she was launched on 28 March 1944.

History
She was allocated to the Army Transport Service, on 5 May 1944. She was converted at Point Clear, Alabama, into an Aircraft Repair Unit (Floating) (ARU(F)) and designated USAAFS Thomas LeValley (ARU(F)-3). The conversion added the following shops on the Liberty ship; machine, sheet metal, radiator, tank, wood, pattern, blue print, electrical, fabric and dope, paint, air-conditioned instrument and camera, radio, battery, propeller, tires and fuel cells, armament and turrets, plating, oxygen plant, radar, carburetor, and turbo-super-charger. Two LCVPs and two DUKWs were added for ship to shore transportation along with three or four Sikorsky R-4s helicopters.

The crew was given two weeks training in seamanship at the Grand Hotel in Point Clear, Alabama, on Mobile Bay. Classes included; swimming, elementary seamanship, life saving equipment, and advanced seamanship.

On 15 November 1944, Thomas LeValley sailed from Brookley Field for the Pacific. She first visited Guantanamo Bay, Cuba, before setting sail for the Panama Canal and arriving in Finschhafen, 1 January 1945.

On 21 February 1945, Thomas LeValley anchored in Lingayen Bay, and began her mission of transferring and repairing equipment from onshore. All six ARU(F)s had their names changed at the end of April 1945, from their original Liberty ship names to their new "General" names. Thomas LeValley was renamed Major General Walter R. Weaver. The United States Navy Armed Guard was withdrawn on 4 May 1945, and returned to the US for reassignment.

On 1 August 1945, Major General Walter R. Weaver transferred to Subic Bay, where she stayed until returning to the US.

On 5 March 1946, she was laid up in the National Defense Reserve Fleet, in the James River Group, in Lee Hall, Virginia. On 27 February 1970, she was sold, along with three other ships, for $470,500 to S.P.A. Cantieri Navali, Genova, Italy, for scrapping. She was removed from the fleet on 1 May 1970.

References

Bibliography

 
 
 
 
 
 

 

Liberty ships
Ships built in Panama City, Florida
1944 ships
James River Reserve Fleet